Brusqeulia monoloba is a species of moth of the family Tortricidae. It is found in Minas Gerais, Brazil.

The wingspan is about 13 mm. The ground colour of the forewings is yellowish cream with indistinct brownish yellow suffusion and fine brownish strigulation (fine streaks). The markings are brown. The hindwings are cream, but brownish grey on the peripheries.

Etymology
The specific name refers to the termination of the sacculus and is derived from Greek lobos (meaning lobe) and monos (meaning singular).

References

Moths described in 2011
Brusqeulia
Moths of South America
Taxa named by Józef Razowski